The Zambia national handball team is the national handball team of Zambia.

African Championship record
2020 – 16th place
2022 – 13th place

References

External links
IHF profile

Men's national handball teams
Handball